Hyala is a genus of very small, somewhat amphibious land snails that have a gill and an operculum, semi-terrestrial gastropod mollusks or micromollusks  in the family Iravadiidae. They are subsurface deposit feeders.

Species
Species within the genus Hyala include:
 Hyala adamsi Golikov & Kussakin in Golikov & Scarlato, 1971
 Hyala vitrea (Montagu, 1803)
Species brought into synonymy
 Hyala mediterranea F. Nordsieck, 1972: synonym of Hyala vitrea (Montagu, 1803)

References

  Ponder W. F. (1984) A review of the genera of the Iravadiidae (Gastropoda: Rissoacea) with an assessment of the relationships of the family. Malacologia 25(1): 21-71. page(s): 51-52
 Vaught, K.C. (1989). A classification of the living Mollusca. American Malacologists: Melbourne, FL (USA). . XII, 195 pp.
 Gofas, S.; Le Renard, J.; Bouchet, P. (2001). Mollusca, in: Costello, M.J. et al. (Ed.) (2001). European register of marine species: a check-list of the marine species in Europe and a bibliography of guides to their identification. Collection Patrimoines Naturels, 50: pp. 180–213

Iravadiidae